Philippe Dana (born 5 September 1959) is a French journalist, producer, radio and television host.

Radio career
Philippe Dana presented several radio, first on radio stations in the early 1980s, then in 1988 Europe 1, and on France Inter from 1989 to 1996.

TV career
In October 1984, he joined Canal+. From 1986 he was the presenter of the show cartoons Ça cartoon on this channel. From 1990 to 1992, he was the voice-over of Les Nuls L'émission, and that of Kad and Olivier's sketches, including Kamoulox. From 1992 he was the voice-over of the closing ceremonies of the Cannes Film Festival and the César Awards, broadcast on Canal+.

From 1998 to 2001, he was Alain de Greef's assistant to management programs on Canal+. In 1998, he was one of the speakers of the documentary directed by Pierre Carles Pas vu pas pris, devoted to media and more particularly to the internal operations of Canal+.

Philippe Dana also presented I>Cinema, a magazine dedicated to cinema, on i>Télé. In February 2009, he left the Canal+ Group and created a production company.

References

1959 births
French radio presenters
French television presenters
Living people
Place of birth missing (living people)